In Australia, the term beat is used to refer to an area frequented by gay men, where sexual acts occur. This use of the word parodies the beat walked by a police officer or a prostitute. Most commonly, public toilets, parks, and nightclubs are used as beats, though sometimes suburban car parks become beats after nightfall. Sex researchers have found that a considerable proportion of men who use "beats" are men who have sex with men (MSMs) rather than gay-identifying. This is possibly because, while gay men have a plethora of venues for meeting legitimately, MSMs – who are often closeted – may not wish to risk being observed in (or reported as attending) gay venues.

History
Although little is known about beats in the early colonial and Federation periods, it is known that specific areas in larger cities, such as Sydney, Melbourne and Brisbane have recorded histories of use for this purpose through the 20th century to the present .

Social and sexual behaviour in beats
Presently, beats are known to be actively used by men who have sex with men (MSM). Due to the casual nature and anonymity of most of the encounters, beats have been identified as areas of high risk for the transmission of HIV, syphilis and other sexually transmitted infections.

Law
Engaging in sexual activity in a public place is against the law in all states and territories in Australia. Police have been criticised for excessive patrolling of known beats, and the defence of entrapment is commonly used by those caught when charged. People using beats are also more likely to be subject to homophobic hate crimes and other general crimes than gay men who do not use beats, prompting some to welcome the police presence .  In Sydney and Melbourne at least, gay beats have attracted some attention from some sections of the media. This has led to a police presence at those identified. There is currently a NSW Parliamentary inquiry into hate crimes (public submissions closed 7 November 2018).

See also

 Cottaging
 Gay bathhouse
 Gay cruising in the United Kingdom

References

External links
 Queer Australia's list of beats by State
 Medical Journal of Australia 2005; 183 (4) – Epidemic syphilis among homosexually active men in Sydney
 The Anti-Violence Project's Sydney Safety Information
 Squirt's global listing of gay cruising areas
 User-editable global directory of gay cruising hotspots
 Community-maintained gay meeting places in Australia

Gay culture
Casual sex
LGBT culture in Australia
Male homosexuality